Rusty Zinn (born April 3, 1970 in Long Beach, California, United States) is an American electric blues and reggae guitarist and singer-songwriter. Zinn released six albums between 1996 and 2009, on Black Top, Alligator, Bad Daddy, and 9 Above Records. He has worked with Mark Hummel, Kim Wilson, Larry Taylor, and Sly Dunbar.

Biography
Zinn was raised in Northern California, and was introduced to music via both his mother's and brother's record collections. He bought blues recordings himself, intrigued by guitar players such as Robert Lockwood, Jr., Eddie Taylor, and Jimmy Rogers. Having practised the drums as a youngster, Zinn purchased his first guitar at the age of seventeen, and then witnessed Luther Tucker perform in concert with Rogers. Within twelve months, Tucker invited Zinn onstage and gave him some guitar playing advice. By the late 1980s, Zinn was playing in several Bay Area bands, and had backed both Rogers and Snooky Pryor.

A spell in Mark Hummel's backing band The Blues Survivors followed, and he later met Kim Wilson at the 1992 San Francisco Blues Festival. Subsequently, Zinn joined Wilson's band, alongside the former Canned Heat bassist, Larry Taylor, and played on Wilson's 1993 album Tigerman. He also toured, and played on Wilson's 1994 effort, That's Life.

In 1996, Zinn released his solo debut album, Sittin' & Waitin' , on Black Top Records, which saw Wilson act as both accompanist and record producer. It earned Zinn a Blues Music Award nomination as 'Best New Blues Artist'. Confessin''' was issued by Zinn in 1999, and then The Chill (2000), featuring Elvin Bishop on slide guitar. Zinn's more recent issues included Zinfidelity, Vol. 1 (2005) and Reggaeblue (2007). The latter fused blues, reggae and soul stylings.

In 2009, Zinn released Manifestation'', which was recorded in Jamaica, and included contributions from Sly Dunbar, Robbie Lynn, Boris Gardiner and Scully Simms.

Discography

References

External links
Official website
Zinn photographs at Google.co.uk

1970 births
Living people
American blues singers
American blues guitarists
American male guitarists
American male singer-songwriters
American reggae musicians
American blues singer-songwriters
Electric blues musicians
Musicians from Long Beach, California
Singer-songwriters from California
Guitarists from California
21st-century American singers
21st-century American guitarists
21st-century American male singers